Marc Lucien Lavoine (born 6 August 1962 in Longjumeau) is a French singer and actor. In 1985, his hit single "Elle a les yeux revolver..." reached number four on the French Singles chart and marked the beginning of his successful singing career. He starred in the television series Crossing Lines as Louis Daniel, head of an International Criminal Court police team that investigates crimes that 'cross' European borders.

Singing career
Marc Lavoine is a French singer born near Paris. He was labeled a heart throb at the beginning of his career and remains popular. He released his first album, Le Parking des Anges, in 1985 with his song "Elle a les yeux revolver..." as a favorite among teens. In 1987, Lavoine released his second album Fabriqué. His single, "Qu'est-ce que t'es belle", was a duet with Les Rita Mitsouko leader Catherine Ringer. His third album Les Amours Du Dimanche was released in 1989, which sold 300,000 copies.

In 1992, the singles "Paris", also the title track of his fourth album, and "L'Amour de trente secondes" gained success. In 1993, Lavoine released his fifth album Faux Rêveur. Lavoine's sixth album Lavoine-Matic, released in 1996, included the single "C'est ça la France", which is a song of tolerance and was awarded Best Video from the Victoire de la Musique. In 1999, his seventh album Septième Ciel was released, with the first single as "Les Tournesols".

Lavoine's eighth album, which did not have a title, was released in 2001. Like former albums, this featured duets with female singers, including Italian singer and actress Cristina Marocco, singer Françoise Hardy and actress Claire Keim. In 2003, he released the single "Dis-moi que l'amour" and a live album entitled Olympia Deux Mille Trois. Lavoine's ninth album L'Heure d'été, included singles "Je me sens si seul", "Toi mon amour" and "J'espère", a duet with Belgian singer of Vietnamese descent Quynh Anh. He also wrote the song "Bonjour Vietnam" as a gift for Quynh Anh.

Personal life

Marc Lavoine has a son, Simon, from his first marriage to ex-Vogue model Denise Pascale.

In 1995 he married Sarah Poniatowski (from the Poniatowski family, which is originally from Poland); they have three children together: Yasmine, Roman, and Milo (born 1 July 2010). They divorced in 2018.

On 25 July 2020 he married the novelist Line Papin. They divorced in 2022.

He now lives in Paris and has put out numerous albums along with several movies.

Philanthropy
Lavoine is a member of the Les Enfoirés charity ensemble since 1996. He has no other known charitable interests.

Discography

Studio albums
 
 1985: Marc Lavoine (Philips)
 1987: Fabriqué (Avrep/PolyGram)
 1989: Les Amours du dimanche (Avrep/PolyGram)
 1991: Paris (Avrep/PolyGram)
 1993: Faux rêveur (BMG)
 1996: Lavoine Matic (Avrep/RCA/BMG)
 1999: 7e ciel (Avrep/RCA/BMG)
 2001: Marc Lavoine (Mercury France/Universal)
 2005: L'Heure d'été (Mercury France/Universal)
 2009: Volume 10 (Mercury France/Universal)
 2012: Je descends du singe (Barclay)
 2018: Je reviens à toi (Universal Music Division Barclay)

Live albums
 Live (1988, Avrep)
 Olympia Deuxmilletrois (2003, Mercury/Universal)

Compilations
 85-95 (1995, Avrep/RCA/BMG)
 C'est ça Lavoine: L'essentiel (2001, Avrep/RCA/BMG) 1984–1999
 Les Duos de Marc (2007, Mercury/Universal)
 Les Solos de Marc (2007, RCA/Sony BMG)
 La Collection de Marc (2007, Mercury/Universal)

Singles

Filmography
1984 : Frankenstein 90
1994 : L'Enfer
1995 : Fiesta
1996 : Les Menteurs
1998 : Cantique de la racaille
1999 : Le double de ma moitié
2001 : Déception
2001 : My Wife Is an Actress
2002 : Blanche
2003 : Le coeur des hommes
2002 : The Good Thief
2003 : Les clefs de bagnole
2006 : Toute la beauté du monde
2006 : Arthur and the Minimoys (French voice of Darkos played by Jason Bateman)
2007 : Le cœur des hommes 2
2007 : Si c'était lui...
2009 : Korkoro (Liberté) 
2013 : Crossing Lines
2014 : Papa was not a rolling stone

References

External links
 Biography of Marc Lavoine, from Radio France Internationale
 

1962 births
Bisexual male actors
Bisexual musicians
French male singers
French pop singers
French LGBT singers
Living people
People from Longjumeau
20th-century French LGBT people
21st-century French LGBT people